Pittsburg Unified School District is a public school district based in Contra Costa County, California, United States.

The district includes the majority of Pittsburg and a small section of Bay Point.

Schools
High schools:
 Black Diamond High School
 Pittsburg High School

Junior high schools:
 Hillview Junior High School
 Martin Luther King, Jr. Junior High School
 Rancho Medanos Junior High School

Elementary schools:
 Foothill Elementary School
 Heights Elementary School
 Highlands Elementary School
 Los Medanos Elementary School
 Marina Vista Elementary School
 Parkside Elementary School
 Stoneman Elementary School
 Willow Cove Elementary School

Adult education:
 Pittsburg Adult Education Center

References

External links
 

School districts in Contra Costa County, California